Hathiwind, also known as Hathi Pind, is a village in the Sargodha District of Punjab province, Pakistan. This road separates the village in two parts.

There is a government hospital and a girls primary school. Most of students have to go surrounding cities and towns for education. There is also a large graveyard (100 acres) in this town which is 500 hundred year old.

References

Populated places in Sargodha District